The United Nasserist Party, also translated as the Unified Nasserist Party, is a political party formed by the merger of four different parties.

The parties which agreed to merge were the: Arab Democratic Nasserist Party, the Dignity Party, the National Conciliation Party and the Nasserist Popular Conference Party.

References

Arab nationalism in Egypt
Nasserist political parties
Nationalist parties in Egypt
Political parties with year of establishment missing
Socialist parties in Egypt